Lawn bowls at the 2022 Commonwealth Games – Men's singles was held at the Victoria Park from August 2 to 6. A total of 18 athletes from 18 associations participated in the event.

Sectional play
The top two from each section advance to the knockout stage.

Section A

Section B

Section C

Section D

Knockout stage

External links
Results

References

Men's singles